Bojana Popović née Petrović, (born 20 November 1979) is a handball coach and a retired Montenegrin handballer. She is considered by many to be the best female handball player of the past decade, despite not being given any official recognition. After winning the Women's EHF Champions League with Budućnost and a silver medal at the 2012 Olympic Games with the Montenegro national team, Bojana Popović decided to retire from handball. However, in June 2016 Popović announced she would come out of retirement and make herself available for selection by the Montenegro national handball team to compete at the 2016 Summer Olympics in Rio de Janeiro.

Career
Bojana Popović started playing handball at Serbian club HC Naisa Niš when she was eleven years old. She later played for Montenegrin club Budućnost Podgorica for four seasons. In 2002, Popović signed a contract with Danish team Slagelse DT, at that time coached by Anja Andersen. With Slagelse, she experienced great success: three times Champions League winner, EHF Cup winner, three Danish Championship golds and one Danish Cup.

At the end of the 2006/07 season, Popović signed a contract with Viborg HK. Since her arrival at Viborg, she has won two Danish Championship golds and two Danish Cups. In 2009 she won her fourth Champions League title, the first with Viborg.

Team results
Club
 Champions League
Winner 2004, 2005 and 2007 (Slagelse); 2009, 2010 (Viborg) and 2012 (ŽRK Budućnost T-Mobile)
 EHF Cup
Winner 2003 (Slagelse)
 Danish Championship
Gold 2003, 2005 and 2007 (Slagelse); 2008, 2009 and 2010 (Viborg)
 Danish Cup
Winner 2003 (Slagelse); 2007 and 2008 (Viborg)
 Serbian and Montenegrin Championship
Winner 1999, 2000, 2001 and 2002 (Budućnost Podgorica)
 Serbian and Montenegrin Cup
Winner 2000, 2001 and 2002 (Budućnost Podgorica)
 Montenegrin Championship
Winner 2011, 2012
 Montenegrin Cup
Winner 2011, 2012

National team
 World Championship 2001
Bronze medal (Yugoslavia)
 Summer Olympics 2012
Silver medal

Awards and recognition
During her handball career, Bojana Popović was considered to be the best player in the world by many. She has been chosen Player of the Year by the Danish Handball Federation four times. Popović's individual awards and achievements include:
 Player of the year in Denmark in 2004, 2005, 2007 and 2008
 Topscorer of the Danish League 2003/04 and 2004/05
 Topscorer of the Champions League in 2004, 2005 and 2007
 "Cup Fighter" 2008
 Montenegrin Sportsperson of the Year: 2012

References

External links
European Handball Federation – Bojana Popovic
Viborg HK – Player profile 

1979 births
Living people
Sportspeople from Niš
Montenegrin female handball players
Viborg HK players
Handball players at the 2012 Summer Olympics
Handball players at the 2016 Summer Olympics
Olympic handball players of Montenegro
Montenegrin people of Serbian descent
Olympic medalists in handball
Olympic silver medalists for Montenegro
Medalists at the 2012 Summer Olympics
Expatriate handball players
Handball coaches of international teams